The Time, the Place and the Girl is a 1929 American pre-Code black-and-white musical film directed by Howard Bretherton and starring Grant Withers and Betty Compson. It is based on the 1907 musical play of the same name. It is not related to the 1946 musical film of The Time, the Place and the Girl.

Since the 1970s, the film has been considered lost, with only its soundtrack remaining.

Plot summary

Cast
 Grant Withers as Jim Crane
 Betty Compson as Doris Ward
 Gertrude Olmstead as Mae Ellis
 James Kirkwood, Sr. as The Professor
 Vivien Oakland as Mrs. Davis
 Gretchen Hartman as Mrs. Winters
 Irene Haisman as Mrs. Parks
 John Davidson as Pete Ward
 Gerald King as Radio announcer
 Bert Roach as Bert Holmes

Soundtrack
 "I Wonder Who's Kissing Her Now"
Written by Joseph E. Howard and Harold Orlob
Lyrics by William M. Hough and Frank R. Adams
 "Collegiate"
Written by Moe Jaffe and Nat Bonx
 "Collegiana"
Written by Jimmy McHugh and Dorothy Fields
 "Doin' the Raccoon"
Written by Raymond Klages, J. Fred Coots and Herb Magidson
 "Fashionette"
Written by Robert King and Jack Glogau
 "Jack and Jill"
Written Larry Spier and Sam Coslow
 "How Many Times"
Written by Irving Berlin
 "Everything I Do I Do For You"
Written by Al Sherman
 "If You Could Care"
Written by E. Ray Goetz, Arthur Wimperis and Herman Darewski

See also
 List of lost films
 List of early Warner Bros. sound and talking features

References

External links
 
 
 
 
 

1929 films
1929 musical comedy films
American black-and-white films
Warner Bros. films
Films directed by Howard Bretherton
Lost American films
1929 lost films
Lost musical comedy films
Films based on musicals
1920s English-language films